Pierre-Hugues Herbert and Albano Olivetti were the defending champions but decided not to participate.
Dudi Sela and Jimmy Wang won the final 6–1, 6–2 against Philipp Marx and Florin Mergea to win the title.

Seeds

Draw

Draw

References
 Main Draw

Orange Open Guadeloupe - Doubles
2013 Doubles